The Kievan Letter, or Kyivan letter  is an early 10th-century (ca. 930) letter thought to be written by representatives of the Jewish community in Kiev. The letter, a Hebrew-language recommendation written on behalf of one member of their community, was part of an enormous collection brought to Cambridge by Solomon Schechter from the Cairo Geniza. It was discovered in 1962 during a survey of the Geniza documents by Norman Golb of the University of Chicago. The letter is dated by most scholars to around 930 CE. Some think (on the basis of the "pleading" nature of the text, mentioned below) that the letter dates from a time when Khazars were no longer a dominant force in the politics of the city. According to Marcel Erdal, the letter  does not come from Kyiv but was sent to Kyiv.

Historical significance
Some scholars point to a district in Kievan Podil named after the Khazars (called "Kozare"), which indicates to some that Turkic Khazars lived in Kiev. The Khazars apparently played a significant role in the economic vitality of the city, importing caviar, fish and salt into Kiev. This may point to a Radhanite presence in the city, which was common in greater Khazaria. 

If so, it might at first glance suggest that Khazar control over Kiev, in some form or another, continued well into the 10th century, significantly later than the traditional date for conquest by Oleg, 882. On the other hand, the letter itself implies that the Khazar authorities could do little to help the Jewish community of Kiev. The letter itself had ended up in Egypt, and the beleaguered alms-seeker had presumably travelled thousands of miles in his search for relief. The identity and the status of the reviewing officer is therefore ambiguous. It would seem more likely that the letter was reviewed in Khazaria while Khazar Jewish power had waned not only in Kiev but also in the heartland itself (sometime in the 11th century).

Linguistic significance 

Linguists are interested in the letter because the names of the community members are of Turkic, Slavic, and Hebrew origins (for example, names such as: "Hanukkah," "Yehudah," "Gostata," and "Kiabar"). There is some disagreement as to whether the Jews were Israelites who had taken local names or whether their names indicate Turkic or Slavic origins. The debate is complicated by the presence of the name Kiabar Kohen. According to Omeljan Pritsak, the name indicates that non-Israelite Khazars adopted the status of Kohen, possibly because they had formed a pre-conversion priestly caste. Another explanation is that Israelite Jews in Khazaria adopted Khazar Turkic names, much as Jews, including prominent rabbis, had adopted Arabic, Aramaic, German, Greek, Persian, and Slavic names. 

The letter may contain the only written record of the Khazar language extant today, the single word-phrase "I have read [it]". Bur Erdal argues against that hypothesis and favours Bolgar-Chuvash (hakurüm from the reconstructed verb *okï-, 'call out, recite, read') and suggests that it originated in the Danube-Bulgar region. (Similar inscriptions in Latin and Greek are found in Byzantine documents from roughly the same period.)

Text

The First among the foremost [i.e. God], He who is adorned with the crown "Final and First,"
Who hears the whispered voice, and listens to utterance and tongue - May He guard them
as the pupil [of his eye] and make them to dwell with Nahshon on high as at first - 
Men of Truth, despisers of gain, doers of [deeds of] loving-kindness and pursuers of charity,
guardians of salvation whose bread is available to every traveler and passerby,
holy communities scattered to all (the world's) corners: may it be the will of
the Master of Peace to make them dwell as a crown of peace! Now, our officers and masters,
we, [the] community of Kiev, (hereby inform you of the woesome affair of this Mar Jacob bar
Hanukah, who is of the sons of [good folk]. He was of the givers, and not of the
takers, until a cruel decree was decreed against him, in that his brother went and took money
from gentiles; this Jacob stood surety. His brother went on the road, and there came
brigands who slew him and took his money. Then came creditors
[and t]ook captive this Jacob, they put chains of iron on his neck
and irons about his legs. He stayed there an entire year ...
[and afterwards] we took him in surety; we paid out sixty [coins] and there ye[t...]
remained forty coins; so we have sent him among the holy communities
that they might take pity on him. So now, O our masters, raise up your eyes to heaven
and do as is your goodly custom, for you know how great is the virtue
of charity. For charity saves from death. Nor are we as warners
but rather those who remind; and to you will be charity before the Lord your God
You shall eat fruits in this world, and the capital fund [of merit] shall be yours perpetually in the world to come.
Only be strong and of good courage, and do not put our words behind
your backs; and may the Omnipresent have mercy upon you and build Jerusalem in your days
and redeem you and also us with you. (An acronym follows standing for either "Amen, Amen, Amen, soon [may the redemption come]" or "Brotherly people are we, soon [...]".)
Abraham the Parnas [community leader] [...]el bar MNS Reuben bar
GWSTT (Gostata) bar KYBR (Kiabar) Kohen Samson
Judah, who is called SWRTH (Surta) Hanukah bar Moses
QWFYN (Kufin) bar Joseph MNR (Manar) bar Samuel Kohen
Judah bar Isaac [the] Levite Sinai bar Samuel
Isaac the Parnas [An Old Turkic/Steppean rovas inscription follows, read variously as okhqurüm/hokurüm/hakurüm, "I read (this or it)"]

 See also 
History of the Jews in Kyiv
History of the Jews in Ukraine

References

Bibliography

 Golb, Norman and Omeljan Pritsak. Khazarian Hebrew Documents of the Tenth Century. Ithaca: Cornell Univ. Press, 1982 .

External links
 The Kievan Letter scan in the Cambridge University Library collection.
 Khazarian Rovas inscription on the Kievien Letter in the book Heritage of Scribes. It is fully available from Google Books at https://books.google.com/books?id=TyK8azCqC34C&pg=PA173
 Napolskikh V.'' The “Kievan letter” and the alleged Khazarian rule in Kiev (presentation)

Khazar diplomacy and documents
10th-century manuscripts
Earliest known manuscripts by language
Jews and Judaism in Kyiv
Manuscripts from the Cairo Geniza
Letters (message)
Kievan Rus culture
Manuscripts in Cambridge
Khazar language